"G.H.E.T.T.O.U.T." (pronounced "Ghetto-u-t") is a song by American R&B duo Changing Faces.  Released in 1997 from their second album, All Day, All Night (1997), and produced by R. Kelly, the single reached number eight on the US Billboard Hot 100 and spent four weeks at number one on the Billboard R&B chart. The song also became a top-10 hit in the United Kingdom and reached number 22 in New Zealand.

Track listings
US CD and cassette single
 "G.H.E.T.T.O.U.T." (single version)
 "Goin' Nowhere" (album version)

US 12-inch single
A1. "G.H.E.T.T.O.U.T." (single version)
A2. "G.H.E.T.T.O.U.T." (instrumental)
B1. "G.H.E.T.T.O.U.T." (album version)
B2. "Goin' Nowhere" (album version)

UK CD and 12-inch single, Australian CD single
 "G.H.E.T.T.O.U.T." (single version) – 4:08
 "G.H.E.T.T.O.U.T." (album version) – 4:28
 "G.H.E.T.T.O.U.T. Part II" (album version) – 3:52
 "G.H.E.T.T.O.U.T." (instrumental) – 4:28
 "G.H.E.T.T.O.U.T. Part II" (instrumental) – 3:52

UK cassette single
 "G.H.E.T.T.O.U.T." (single version) – 4:08
 "G.H.E.T.T.O.U.T. Part II" (album version) – 4:28

Charts

Weekly charts

Year-end charts

Certifications

|}

Release history

References

See also
 R&B number-one hits of 1997 (USA)

1997 singles
Big Beat Records (American record label) singles
Changing Faces (group) songs
Song recordings produced by R. Kelly
Songs about infidelity
Songs written by R. Kelly